Lanesville Township is located in Sangamon County, Illinois. As of the 2010 census, its population was 208 and it contained 84 housing units.  Lanesville Township formed from Illiopolis Township in 1875 under the name of Wheatfield, which was subsequently changed to Lanesville.

It comprises parts of government townships 15, 16 and 17 north, range 2 west, and is bounded on the east by Illiopolis Township, south by the Sangamon River, west by Mechanicsburg Township and Buffalo Hart Township Buffalo Hart and north by Logan County.

Schools
Lanesville Township is served by three school districts:

Tri-City Community Unit School District 1 - - district website
Sangamon Valley Community Unit School District 9 - - district website
Mt. Pulaski Community Unit District 23 - - district website

Geography

Demographics

References

External links
City-data.com
Illinois State Archives

Townships in Sangamon County, Illinois
Springfield metropolitan area, Illinois
Townships in Illinois